The Richmond RiverRats were a collegiate summer baseball team based in Richmond, Indiana. They were a member of the summer collegiate Prospect League from their founding in 2009 until their last season in 2015.

The RiverRats played at the 1,787-seat Don McBride Stadium.

Seasons

Players of the Year

Prospect League Batting Title: Joseph Villegas, OF - .363

Players Drafted to Major League Teams

References

External links
Richmond RiverRats

Prospect League teams
Amateur baseball teams in Indiana
Sports in Richmond, Indiana
Defunct baseball teams in Indiana